is a university in Obihiro, Hokkaido, Japan, commonly referred to as Obihiro University. It was founded in 1941, as the Obihiro Technical School of Veterinary Medicine.

As of 2009, the university employs 136 faculty members and a full-time staff of over 100. It offers instruction to 1,300 students in bachelors, masters, and doctoral programs. The university accepts an average of 14 foreign students and sends out an average of seven study abroad students each year.

Schools
This university has two schools below:
 School of Agriculture
 School of Cooperative Veterinary Medicine

Graduate school

Master courses 
Master's Program in Animal Science and Agriculture
 Laboratory of Veterinary Life Science
 Laboratory of Animal Production Science
 Laboratory of Ecology and Environmental Science
 Laboratory of Food Science
 Laboratory of Agricultural Economics
 Laboratory of Engineering for Agriculture
 Laboratory of Plant Production Science

Doctoral courses 
 Doctoral Program of Animal Science and Agriculture
 Faculty of Doctoral Program of Animal Science and Agriculture
 Doctoral Program of Veterinary Science
 Faculty of Doctoral Program of Veterinary Science

Departments 
This university has four departments

 Department of Veterinary Medicine
 Department of Life and Food Sciences
 Department of Agro-environmental Science
 Department of Human Sciences

References

External links
 Obihiro University of Agriculture and Veterinary Medicine

Japanese national universities
Veterinary schools in Japan
Universities and colleges in Hokkaido
Educational institutions established in 1941
1941 establishments in Japan
Hokkaido American Football Association